The Chathurveda Samhitha (Sanskrit  Malayalam ) is a set of the four books making up the Chatur Veda Samhita, a compilation of all four Veda Mantras with many detailed studies in Malayalam.

Etymology
Chathurveda Samhitha is made of three words - "Chathur", "Veda" and "Samhitha". "Chathur" meaning four, "Veda" meaning knowledge and "Samhitha" meaning collection. The detailed meaning of this word is "collection of Veda Mantras".

Vedas
The four Vedas are Rig Veda, Yajur Veda, Sama Veda and Atharva Veda. They consist of hymns called Mantras which contain all knowledge in "seed" form (Bheeja roopa). They are among the oldest known works of literature, originally passed down via the oral tradition. Many scholars like Maharishi Dayananda Saraswati state that the Vedas originated at the beginning of this cycle of creation 1.97 billion (197 crore) years before, as per Soorya Sidhantha derived from Atharva Veda.

General belief
It is popularly believed (by scholars like Shankara) that Vedas consists of four parts - 
 Mantras or Mantra Samhithas
 Brahmanas 
 Aranyakas 
 Upanishads

Reality about Vedas
Vedas consists of Mantra Samhithas only, which believed to be Apourusheya (Sanskrit ) - not of human origin but divine creation. Brahmanas and Aranyakas are basically the same and Upanishads are written by sages (ancient scholars) as interpretation of Vedas.

Popular misconceptions about the contents of Vedas
 Vedas are written by Humans (Rishis), not of divine origin .
 It is commonly believed that Vedas are three in number, not four. Many consider only Rig Veda, Yajur Veda and Sama Veda as Vedas. Atharva Veda is said to have originated recently and is not part of Vedas.
 Vedas contain fearful begging by cowherd/shepherds to please the fierce natural forces.
 Vedas permit meat eating.
 Vedas mention about multitude of Gods.

About this book
The first time all four Veda Mantra Samhitas were printed with Swara-Sthana (punctuation for pronunciation) in Malayalam alphabets was the magum opus work of Narendra Bhooshan along with various studies on Vedic subjects.

The language of the Vedas is Vedic Sanskrit (1400BCE -300BCE )which uses special characters to give proper pronunciation.

Volumes
The book is compiled in 4 volumes, each of 1008 pages

Volume 1
 Vedaadyanthangal (Beginning & ends of Vedas)
 Chatur Veda Paryatanam - a journey through 4 Vedas
 Rigvedadi Bashya Bhoomika
 Vedadhikara Niroopanam
 Vaidika Swara Shaashtram
 Vaidika Yagaswaroopam
 Vaidika Vangmayathinte Rooparekha

Volume 2
 Rigvedapadanam
 Rigveda Samhita (Devanagari lipi with Swaras marked & Malayalam script)
 Rishi, Devata, Chandhass, Swaraanukramanika in Rigveda
 Mantraanukramanika
 Devata concepts in Rigveda - a study

Volume 3
 Yajurvedapadanam
 Yajurveda Samhita (Devanagari lipi with Swaras marked & Malayalam script)
 Rishi, Devata, Chandhass, Swaraanukramanika in Yajurveda
 Devata concepts in Yajurveda
 Samavedapadanam
 Samaveda Samhita (Devanagari lipi with Swaras marked & Malayalam script)
 Rishi, Devata, Chandhass, Swaraanukramanika in Samaveda
 Devata concepts in Samaveda

Volume 4
 Atharvavedapadanam
 Atharvaveda Samhita (Devanagari lipi with Swaras marked & Malayalam script)
 Rishi, Devata, Chandhass, Swaraanukramanika in Atharvaveda
 Selected Sooktas with meaning
 Mantraanukramanika

References

Vedas